Ken and Neal Skupski were the defending champions but chose not to defend their title.

Fabrice Martin and Hugo Nys won the title after defeating David Pel and Antonio Šančić 6–4, 6–2 in the final.

Seeds

Draw

References
 Main draw

Open BNP Paribas Banque de Bretagne - Doubles
2019 Doubles